Márcio Barbosa Vieira Junior, commonly known as Marcinho, is a Brazilian footballer who plays as a midfielder for Criciúma.

Career
Marcinho began his career at Londrina, representing the team in 2015 Campeonato Brasileiro Série C and 2016 Campeonato Brasileiro Série B. In 2018 he was loaned to Oeste for the 2018 Campeonato Brasileiro Série B season, and in 2019 he was loaned to Brasil de Pelotas in a loan-exchange deal with Hélder Maurílio.

In August 2019, though having bids from Portugal, Marcinho ended op joining Manama Club in Bahrain.

References

External links
 
 Marcinho at ZeroZero

Living people
1995 births
Brazilian footballers
Brazilian expatriate footballers
Association football midfielders
Londrina Esporte Clube players
Oeste Futebol Clube players
Operário Ferroviário Esporte Clube players
Grêmio Esportivo Brasil players
Manama Club players
Sampaio Corrêa Futebol Clube players
Cruzeiro Esporte Clube players
Campeonato Brasileiro Série B players
Campeonato Brasileiro Série C players
Bahraini Premier League players
Brazilian expatriate sportspeople in Bahrain
Expatriate footballers in Bahrain
Sportspeople from Londrina